The Myanmar Coast Guard is a maritime law enforcement agency formed to safeguard Myanmar's ocean-based blue economy including marine tourism, maritime trade, deep seaport services, offshore oil and natural gas production and marine fishing, to prevent illegal trespassing in the seas, and to maintain the rule of law at sea. The Myanmar Coast Guard has a constabulary role in the protection of maritime interests, provides search and rescue for victims in the sea, and works toward sea environmental conservation, monitoring a wide range of activities underwater and above water in Myanmar's water territory.

History

Background 
Myanmar was one of the few Asian countries that did not have a force dedicated to offshore patrol. Maritime security was ensured by the Myanmar Navy and the Myanmar Police Force's Maritime Police. Operational demands eventually outstripped their abilities, and the superior operational and diplomatic benefits of a paramilitary organization were recognized.

On 14 March 2019, Myanmar's deputy defence minister submitted a proposal to the Pyithu Hluttaw to establish a national coast guard. The then-civilian government was making efforts to "civilianize" national security affairs and therefore wanted to establish the coast guard under either the Ministry of Transport and Communications or the President's Office. However, according to the 2008 Constitution, all of Myanmar's armed forces are controlled by the Chief of Defence Services.

Establishment 
Initiated by the Aung San Suu Kyi-led NLD government in 2018, the Myanmar Coast Guard was formally established on 6 October 2021 at Thilawa Port in Thanlyin by Min Aung Hlaing, the ruling junta of the country since the February coup. It operates under the Ministry of Defence, in close cooperation with the Myanmar Navy, the Ministry of Livestock, Fisheries and Rural Development, the Ministry of National Planning and Economic Development and the Myanmar Police Force. The new force's remit is to guard Myanmar's 1930km of coastal territory and its territorial waters, which encompass 23,070km2 and about 1000 islands.

Vessels 
The Myanmar Coast Guard started out with four former Navy patrol vessels. These vessels bear the pennant numbers P 311, P 312, P 411 and P 412.

Patrol vessels

Fast Patrol Vessels

References 

Paramilitary organisations based in Myanmar
2021 establishments in Myanmar
Coast guards
Sea rescue organizations
Defence agencies of Myanmar
Law enforcement in Myanmar
Military units and formations established in 2021